Stratesaurus is an extinct genus of small-bodied rhomaleosaurid plesiosaur known from the Early Jurassic period (most likely earliest Hettangian stage) of the United Kingdom. It contains a single species, S. taylori.

Discovery
Stratesaurus is known from the holotype specimen OUMNH J.10337, a dorsoventrally crushed but nearly complete skull, and three-dimensionally preserved partial postcranial skeleton including anterior cervical and pectoral vertebrae, a partial hindlimb and ilium. GSM 26035 was referred to S. taylori because it shares one autapomorphy and other characters with the holotype specimen. It consists of a skull and some anterior cervical vertebrae. AGT 11 was also referred to S. taylori. Although it does nor show the autapomorphies of S. taylori, it is indistinguishable from both OUMNH J.10337 and GSM 26035, and it is possible to distinguish it from similar taxa, like Avalonnectes. All specimens were collected at Street, of Somerset, from the Pre-Planorbis beds of the Blue Lias Formation of the Lower Lias Group. These beds likely occur below the first occurrence of the ammonite Psiloceras planorbis. Thus, they probably fall within the earliest Hettangian P. tilmanni Chronozone, which is about 199.6-198 million years old, immediately following the Triassic–Jurassic Boundary. Plesiosaurs fossils which were discovered at Street represent the earliest known occurrence of the Plesiosauria. Hence, Stratesaurus is one of the oldest plesiosaurs to date.

Description
Stratesaurus is a small-bodied rhomaleosaurid with fivebasalmost rhomaleosaurid. The cladogram below shows Stratesaurus phylogenetic position among other plesiosaurs following Benson et al. (2012).

Etymology
Stratesaurus was first described and named by Roger B. J. Benson, Mark Evans and Patrick S. Druckenmiller in 2012 and the type species is Stratesaurus taylori. The generic name is derived from "Strate", the name for Street as it recorded in the Domesday Book and from Greek sauros, meaning "lizard". The specific name honors the paleontologist Michael A. Taylor, who performed acid preparation of the holotype.

See also

 List of plesiosaur genera
 Timeline of plesiosaur research

References

Prehistoric life of Europe
Early Jurassic plesiosaurs of Europe
Fossil taxa described in 2012
Rhomaleosaurids
Sauropterygian genera